The following ships of the Indian Navy have been named Chakra:

 was formerly the  K-43 leased in 1987 from Russia and returned in 1991
 was formerly the  Nerpa leased from Russia in 2011 and currently in service

Indian Navy ship names